Samsu-iluna (Amorite: Shamshu; c. 1750–1712 BC) was the seventh king of the founding Amorite dynasty of Babylon, ruling from 1750 BC to 1712 BC (middle chronology), or from 1686 to 1648 BC (short chronology). He was the son and successor of Hammurabi by an unknown mother. His reign was marked by the violent uprisings of areas conquered by his father and the abandonment of several important cities (primarily in

Circumstances of Samsu-iluna's reign
When Hammurabi rose to power in the city of Babylon, he controlled a small region directly around that city, and was surrounded by vastly more powerful opponents on all sides.  By the time he died, he had conquered Sumer, Eshnunna, Assyria and Mari making himself master of Mesopotamia. He had also significantly weakened and humiliated Elam and the 

While defeated, however, these states were not destroyed; if Hammurabi had a plan for welding them to Babylon he did not live long enough to see it through. Within a few years after his death, Elam and Assyria had left from Babylon's orbit and revolutions had started in all the conquered territories. The task of dealing with these troubles—and others—fell to Samsu-iluna. Though he campaigned tirelessly and seems to have won frequently, the king proved unable to stop the empire's unwinding. Through it all, however, he did manage to keep the core of his kingdom intact, and this allowed the city of Babylon to cement its position in history.

Fragmentation of the Empire

Samsu-iluna seems to have had the upper-hand militarily. Within a year he dealt the coalition a shattering blow which took the northern cities out of the fight. In the aftermath the king of Eshnunna, Iluni, was dragged to Babylon and executed by  Over the course of the next 4 years, Samsu-iluna's armies tangled with Rim-sin's forces up and down the borderlands between Babylon, Sumer and Elam. Eventually Samsu-iluna attacked Ur, pulled down its walls and put the city to the sack, he then did the same to Uruk, and Isin as  Finally Larsa itself was defeated and Rim-sin II was killed, thus ending the 

A few years later, a pretender calling himself Ilum-ma-ili, and claiming descent from the last king of Isin, raised another pan-Sumerian revolt. Ultimately, this proved fruitless; by the time of Samsu-iluna's death, Nippur recognized Ilum-ma-ili as 

Apparently, Eshnunna had not reconciled itself to Babylonian control either, because in Samsu-iluna's 20th year it rebelled  Samsu-iluna marched his army through the region and, presumably after some bloodshed, constructed the fortress of Dur-samsuiluna to keep them  in line. This seems to have done the trick, as later documents see Samsu-iluna take a more conciliatory stance repairing infrastructure and restoring 

Both Assyria and Elam used the general chaos to re-assert their independence. Kuturnahunte I of Elam, seizing the opportunity left by Samsu-iluna's attack on Uruk, marched into the (now wall-less) city and plundered it. Among the items looted was a statue of Inanna which would not be returned until the reign of Ashurbanipal eleven centuries  In Assyria, a native vice regent named Puzur-Sin ejected Asinum who had been a vassal king of his fellow Amorite Hammurabi. A native king Ashur-dugul seized the throne, and a period of civil war in Assyria ensued. Samsu-Iluna seems to have been powerless to intervene, and finally a king named Adasi, restored a stable native dynasty in Assyria, removing any vestages of Amorite-Babylonian influence

In the end, Samsu-iluna was left with a kingdom that was only fractionally larger than the one his father had started out with 50 years prior (but which did leave him mastery of the Euphrates up to and including the ruins of Mari and its  The status of Eshnunna is difficult to determine with any accuracy, and while it may have remained in Babylonian hands the city was exhausted and its political influence at an end.

Depopulation of Sumer

Samsu-iluna's campaigns might not have been solely responsible for the havoc wreaked upon Uruk and Ur, and his loss of Sumer might have been as much a calculated retreat as defeat.

Records in the cities of Ur and Uruk essentially stop after the 10th year of Samsu-iluna's reign, their priests apparently continued writing, but from more northerly  Larsa's records also end about this time. Records keep going in Nippur and Isin until Samsu-iluna's 29th year, and then cease there as well. These breaks are also observed in the archeological record, where evidence points to these cities being largely or completely abandoned for hundreds of years, until well into the 

Reasons for this are hard to come by. Certainly the constant warfare cannot have helped matters, but Samsu-iluna appears to have campaigned just as hard in the north, and that region was thriving during the  The rise of Babylon marks a definite end to Sumerian cultural dominance of Mesopotamia and a shift to Akkadian for government and popular  perhaps people who claimed cultural ties to the Sumerian past retrenched around the southerly cities which Iluna-ilu controlled. Several members of his dynasty took Sumerian names, and it appears they consciously strove to return to the region's Sumerian  It is also possible that economic or environmental factors were involved; it is known that both Hammurabi and Rim-sin I had instituted policies which altered the economies of the  perhaps these proved unsustainable in the long-term.

Other campaigns
Slaving raids by Sutean tribes appear to have been a constant problem for Babylon during this period, and Samsu-iluna spent some time dealing with  He promulgated a law barring Babylonian citizens from purchasing as slaves citizens of the (presumably oft-raided) cities of Idamaras and 
In the 9th year of his reign, Samsu-iluna turned back an invasion by a Kassite  This is the earliest known mention of the Kassites, who would go on to rule Babylonia after the collapse of the Amorite dynasty.
Around the 24th year of his reign, Samsu-iluna attacked and destroyed the city of Apum, killing its king Yakun-ashar. A year later he seems to have attacked the city of Terqa as well, possibly adding it to his 
In his 28th year, Samsu-iluna defeated the armies of two otherwise unknown western kings recorded as Iadikhabum and 
In the 35th year of his reign, Samsu-iluna repelled an Amorite

Religious and Astronomical achievements
Though troubled, Samsu-iluna's reign was not entirely focused on war.

Additionally, there is speculation that Samsu-iluna instituted the Standard Babylonian calendar, possibly as a means of tying his empire more closely together.

See also

List of Kings of Babylon
Ancient Near East
Art and architecture of Babylonia and Assyria
Babylon
Babylonia and Assyria
Babylonian law
Babylonian numerals
Babylonian calendar
Short chronology timeline
Cuneiform script
Geography of Babylonia and Assyria
History of Sumer
Iraq
Mesopotamia
Social life in Babylonia and Assyria
Mashkan-shapir

Footnotes

References

External links
Babylonian Empire (Old Babylonian Period) / Dynasty I
Timeline: Apum / Abum (City State of Shehna)
Timeline: Terqa (State of Hana / Hanna / Khana)

18th-century BC Babylonian kings
First dynasty of Babylon
Kings of Larsa